English Freakbeat, Volume 5 is a compilation album in the English Freakbeat series, featuring recordings that were released decades earlier, in the mid-1960s.

Release data
Although test pressings exist (on Rainbo Records) that were made in the same time period as the other LPs (1989), the album was evidently not released as an LP by AIP Records until 1992 (as #AIP-10049).  On the other hand, this is the second volume in the series to be released as a CD, in 1993 (as #AIP-CD-1049).

Vinyl-only tracks and CD bonus tracks
The English Freakbeat LPs and CDs have most tracks in common, although not always in the same order.  In most cases, some of the LP tracks were not included on the CDs.  Also, the CD bonus tracks are not always at the end of the album.  This is the only album in the series that has been released in the conventional way, with all of the tracks on the LP given in the same order on the CD, with the bonus tracks at the end.  Nevertheless, for consistency with the other articles, we have shown track listings for both editions of the album.

Notes on the tracks
Pete Best of course is the drummer for the Beatles who was unceremoniously fired in August 1962 in favor of Ringo Starr.  His recording and touring efforts in the 1960s met with only limited success.

A later rendition of "Why Must They Criticise" by the In Crowd is given on English Freakbeat, Volume 3, and another track by that band is included on English Freakbeat, Volume 4.  The Four + 1 (no relation to Unit 4 + 2) is an earlier line-up of this band, who would eventually become Tomorrow.

Not to be confused with the American band the Cryan Shames, the recordings by the Cryin' Shames were produced by Joe Meek, as were the four singles by Geoff Goddard as a solo artist.  That's Goddard on keyboards on the classic instrumental "Telstar" by the Tornados; he also had considerable success as a songwriter.

An unusual number by Billy J. Kramer's frequent backing band, The Dakotas (who may or may not be behind him on "Chinese Girl") is given on English Freakbeat, Volume 3.

Two different songs by Jason Eddie and the Centremen are given on each of the Pebbles, Volume 6 LP and the English Freakbeat, Volume 6 CD, though not both.

The song by Thane Russal is from his second single; another song, from his first single (using the name Thane Russal and Three) is given on English Freakbeat, Volume 4.

Track listing

LP

Side 1:

 The Pete Best Four: "The Way I Feel About You"
 The Darwin's Theory: "Daytime"
 The Peeps: "Now Is The Time"
 The Pickwicks: "Hello Lady"
 George Bean: "Why Must They Criticize?"
 Jason Eddie & The Centremen: "Come On Baby"
 The Untamed: "It's Not True"
 Geoff Goddard: "Sky Man"

Side 2:

 The Eggy: "You're Still Mine"
 New York Public Library: "Gotta Get Away"
 Chris Sandford: "I Wish They Wouldn't Always Say I Sound Like The Guy From The USA Blues"
 The Cryin' Shames: "What's News, Pussycat"
 A Wild Uncertainty: "A Man With Money"
 The Truth: "Baby You've Got It"
 Billy J. Kramer: "Chinese Girl"

CD
 The Pete Best Four: "The Way I Feel About You"
 The Darwin's Theory: "Daytime"
 The Peeps: "Now Is The Time"
 The Pickwicks: "Hello Lady"
 George Bean: "Why Must They Criticize?"
 Jason Eddie & The Centremen: "Come On Baby"
 The Untamed: "It's Not True"
 Geoff Goddard: "Sky Man"
 The Eggy: "You're Still Mine"
 New York Public Library: "Gotta Get Away"
 Chris Sandford: "I Wish They Wouldn't Always Say I Sound Like The Guy From The USA Blues"
 The Cryin' Shames: "What's News, Pussycat"
 A Wild Uncertainty: "A Man With Money"
 The Truth: "Baby You've Got It"
 Billy J. Kramer: "Chinese Girl"
 The Impac: "Too Far Out", CD bonus track
 The Paul Stewart Movement: "Too Too Good", CD bonus track
 The Greenbeats: "You Must Be The One", CD bonus track
 Rey Anton & The Peppermint Men: "You Can't Judge A Book", CD bonus track
 The Four + 1: "Don't Lie To Me", CD bonus track
 Thane Russal: "I Need You", CD bonus track

1992 compilation albums
Compilation albums by British artists
Pop rock compilation albums
Psychedelic rock compilation albums